Achyuta Samanta FRSC (born 20 January 1964) is an Indian educationist and philanthropist.

Besides education and tribal upliftment, healthcare and rural development, Samanta has contributed to art, culture, literature, film, media, society and national integration. He has also founded Kadambini Magazine and Kuni Katha exclusively for children. Besides, he is also the founder of Kalinga TV and K News Odisha. 

He has been conferred with more than 50 International and National awards and over 200 state awards besides two highest Civilian Awards from Royal Kingdom of Bahrain and Mongolia called ISA Award for Service to Humanity and Best Worker Award respectively. He has been conferred with 50 Honorary Doctorate awards from universities in India and abroad. He is the first Odia to be a member of both UGC and AICTE. He is currently the Member of Parliament (Lok Sabha) from Kandhamal, Odisha and also the President of Volleyball Federation of India. He is the designated President (India) of Democracy without Borders and founder of Parliamentarians for Indigenous People.

Early life 
Samanta was born to Anadi Charan Samanta and Nilima Rani Samanta in the village of Kalarabanka in Cuttack District of Odisha in 1965. His father died when Samanta was four, and he grew up in abject poverty with his widowed mother and seven siblings.

Samanta received an M.Sc. in Chemistry from Utkal University. He had a decade-long experience in teaching in colleges, mostly at Maharshi College under Utkal University, in Bhubaneswar as a chemistry lecturer.

Educationist 
Samanta is the founder, ex chancellor, and secretary of KIIT University; and the  founder of Kalinga Institute of Social Sciences, KISS Deemed to be University, KIIT International School, Kalinga Institute of Medical Sciences (KIMS), KIIT School of Management (KSOM), KIIT School of Rural Management (KSRM), KIIT School of Computer Application (KSCA), KIIT School of Biotechnology (KSBT), KIIT Law School (KLS), KIIT School of Languages (KSOL), Kalinga Institute of Dental Sciences (KIDS) and KIIT Polytechnic.

Member of national and International bodies 
He is a member of University Grants Commission (UGC), Executive Committee Member of  All India Council for Technical Education (AICTE), President of Volleyball Federation of India, Member of Indian Olympic Association, President, 39th World Congress of Poets (WAAC), General President (2017-18) of 105th Indian Science Congress, Advisor of Ministry of Education (Government of Manipur), Academic Council Member of Central University of Orissa, Serving Member of National Council for Teacher Education (NCTE), Coir Board of India, National Executive Council Member of Indian Society for Technical Education, and Executive Committee Member of Indian Science Congress Association (ISCA).

He was also a serving member of international bodies including the International Association of University Presidents (IAUP), United States of America; Institute of International Education (IIE), New York City; Association of University of Asia Pacific (AUAP); University Mobility in Asia and the Pacific (UMAP), Bangkok, Thailand; Asia-Pacific Journal of Public Health (APACPH); United Nations Academic Impact (UNAI), and Asia Economic Forum (AEF), CIFEJ (Centre International Du Films Pour L'enfance Et La Jeunesse, Dubai).

Honoris Causa awards 
 Rashtriya Sanskrit Vidyapeetha – Central University, Tirupati, India − 2011
 Hanseo University, South Korea, 2010
 National University, Cambodia – 2009
 University of Cambodia, Cambodia, 2009
 OIU, Colombo – 2002 and 2005 (D.Sc)
 National Formosa University, Taiwan – 2012
 Gandhi Mandela Awards 2019

Awards and records 
Samanta received a number of awards, and created new records in the field of social entrepreneurship. He was mentioned among the Top 15 Social Entrepreneurs of the World by the American Edge Foundation. Samanta appears in The Limca Book of Records as the youngest chancellor of any University in India.
Outstanding Green Activist Award by India Green Energy Awards organised by Indian Federation of Green Energy (IFGE) – 2019 
Jeevan Gaurav Puraskar (Lifetime Achievement Award) at 4th National Teachers’ Congress by MIT World Peace University, Pune - 2020 
Personality of the Year Award by the Federation of Indian Chambers of Commerce & Industry (FICCI) – 2019
Golden Gabel Award by World Academy of Arts And Culture – 2019
BusinessLine Changemaker Awards 2019 instituted by The Hindu BusinessLine daily – 2019
Conferred the UC Distinguished Professorship in Humanities by The University of Cambodia – 2018
 Hall of Fame Award presented by World CSR Congress, New Delhi – 2015
 Successful Entrepreneur Award at Economic Times Entrepreneurship Summit 2015, New Delhi – 2015
 Civilian Award by Jan Mládek, Industry & Trade Minister of Czech Republic, Vladimír Bärtl, Deputy Minister of Industry & Trade Minister of Czech Republic and M. Stašek, Ambassador of Czech Republic to India at Czech Embassy, New Delhi – 2015
 Think India Award by Think Media at Transforming India Conclave 2014, New Delhi – 2014
 Honorary Fellowship Award by Computer Society of India (CSI), Hyderabad, India – 2014
 Visista Puraskar from 24th Annual Awards – 2014
 Commonwealth of Independent States (CIS), Award, Moscow, Russia – 2014
 Gusi Peace Prize International, Manila, Philippines – 2014
 ‘2013 World of Difference Awards’ by US-based International Alliance for Women (TIAW) – 2014
 Jawaharlal Nehru Award, 2012–2012
 Godfrey Phillips Bravery Award (Social Bravery Award) in recognition of an exceptional Act of Courage – 2011
 Priya Odiya Samman 2007 (Most Endeared Personality in Odisha), through a survey by a National TV Channel – 2007
 Humanitarian Award from Mahatma Gandhi Remembrance Organization, Johannesburg, South Africa – 2004
 First Oriya to receive International Award for Outstanding Social Work by the Indian Embassy, Muscat, Oman
 Received ‘Certificate of Excellence’ in the field of Social Work from the Minister of International Affairs, Government of Cambodia 
 In December 2022, he received Honorary Doctorate degree by Utkal University marking the  50th honorary degree conferred on him.

References 

15. Every Child Needs a KISS – Find Out Why

External links
 Samanta Achyuta

1965 births
Living people
Academic staff of Kalinga Institute of Industrial Technology
Scholars from Bhubaneswar
Utkal University alumni
Academic staff of Utkal University
Founders of Indian schools and colleges
Social workers
Social workers from Odisha
India MPs 2019–present
Lok Sabha members from Odisha
Odisha politicians
Politicians from Bhubaneswar
Odisha local politicians
Biju Janata Dal politicians